The Isango Ensemble (isango meaning "gate" or "port" or "gateway" in Xhosa and Zulu) is a Cape Town-based theatre company led by director Mark Dornford-May and music directors Pauline Malefane and Mandisi Dyantyis. It was established in 2000, when Dornford-May and conductor Charles Hazlewood travelled to South Africa to form a lyric theatre company for the Spier Festival; most of the company members are drawn from the townships around Cape Town. The company's work focuses on re-imagining classics from the Western theatre canon, finding a new context for the stories within a South African or township setting and developing new productions based on South African issues, stories and novels.

Productions
The legacy of South Africa's past has led to enormous gulfs in the world of education and Isango Ensemble strive to bridge this divide. Due to Isango's position and location, they provide a training and educational facility for both staff and community alongside their production work.  Isango's work with young people has brought a sense of belief, aspiration and knowledge into the townships. It has done this by enabling them to transcend the limits of their environment and yet remain proud of their culture and their heritage.The reality of life for many in South Africa is tough and for some of them a genuinely fragile existence. However, Isango never appeals to their audience as victims based on the performers’ backstories but as equals; proud of their work and the community they represent.

In 2001 two of the ensemble's first stage productions toured from Spier Festival in Cape Town to Wilton's Music Hall in London. From there The Mysteries - Yiimimangalisa transferred to West End and uCarmen was performed at many of the world's major arts festivals. Other stage work includes co-productions with the Young Vic of The Magic Flute – Impempe Yomlingo, featuring Mozart's score transposed for an orchestra of marimbas, and A Christmas Carol – Ikrismas Kherol. These won several awards, including The Magic Flute – Impempe Yomlingo winning an Olivier Award for Best Musical Revival and the Globes de Cristal for Best Opera Production following a sold-out season at the Théâtre du Châtelet in Paris. The Magic Flute – Impempe Yomlingo also played a season in the West End. In 2009 Isango played a second West End season of The Mysteries – Yiimimangaliso. In the summer of 2012, La Boheme – Abanxaxhi, a unique partnership with The Global Fund to Fight AIDS, Tuberculosis and Malaria, played at Hackney Empire in London for five weeks. Also in 2012, the company created a new stage version of Shakespeare's Venus & Adonis in partnership with Shakespeare's Globe.

In 2013, the company returned to Shakespeare's Globe with Venus and Adonis and finished editing their new film Noye's Fludde.

2014 saw the company tour the US to universal critical acclaim with sold-out performances and produced another feature film Breathe - Umphefumlo, which had its premiere at the 2015 Berlin International Film Festival and has a special gala screening in South Africa in March 2015, hosted by Archbishop Desmond Tutu.

In 2016, Isango Ensemble adapted Jonny Steinberg's book A Man of Good Hope in co-production with the Young Vic, the Royal Opera, Répons Foundation, BAM and Les Théâtres de la Ville de Luxembourg. The show ran for two months at the Young Vic in London in Autumn 2016 and then played at BAM, New York City's most prestigious international house in February 2017, Hong Kong Arts Festival in February 2018 and in Europe in May/June 2018 at Les Théâtres de la Ville de Luxembourg, Ruhrfestspiele Recklinghausen in Germany and Bergen International Festival in Norway. In 2019 the production toured Adelaide, Auckland, several cities in France and the United Kingdom at the Royal Opera House.

Isango also adapted Fred Khumalo's book Dancing the Death Drill about the sinking of the SS Mendi in 2019 and premiered SS Mendi – Dancing the Death Drill at the Linbury Theatre, Royal Opera House, in London in May 2019. 2019 also saw Isango present productions in Norway in June (St Matthew Passion) and Australia (St Matthew Passion and SS Mendi - Dancing the Death Drill) in early September. Isango then undertook a multi-city tour of the US for nine weeks between late September and mid-November, visiting cities such as Boston, Chicago and New York with productions of Aesop's Fables, A Man of Good Hope and The Magic Flute - Impempe Yomlingo.

Isango since it was formed has toured to Australia, Austria, Canada, France, Germany, Hong Kong, Ireland, Italy, Japan, Luxembourg, Martinique, the Netherlands, Norway, Singapore, Turkey, UK and the United States. Many countries and cities being visited several times.

Films created by Mark Dornford-May and the ensemble include u-Carmen eKhayelitsha, Son of Man, Unogumbe – Noye’s Fludde and Breathe – Umphefumlo. The films have met with popular and critical acclaim, playing at festivals including The Berlin International Film Festival, LA Pan African Film Festival, Sundance Film Festival and others in Australia, the US, the UK, Europe and Africa. They have won the Golden Bear at The Berlin International Film Festival as well as several Best Feature Awards.

References

External links 

 Official website

Special:WhatLinksHere/Julia Anastasopoulos

Theatre companies in South Africa
Cape Town culture